The West Side Kid is a 1943 American crime film directed by George Sherman and starring Don "Red" Barry, Henry Hull, Dale Evans, Chick Chandler, Matt McHugh and Nana Bryant. Written by Albert Beich and Anthony Coldeway, the film was released on August 23, 1943, by Republic Pictures.

Plot
Although publishing a newspaper has made him a success, Sam Winston is so unhappy in his home life that when he meets Johnny April, a criminal just out of jail, he asks Johnny to kill him and offers $25,000. Sam tells a confused Johnny that he doesn't have the nerve to commit suicide, so he will pay Johnny to do the job.

Taking a few days to get to know his victim, Johnny discovers the reasons for Sam's unhappiness. His spoiled daughter Gloria is trifling with a stockbroker boyfriend's affections. His son Jerry is a jobless drunkard. His wife is cold to Sam and is having a fling with his doctor.

The more they're together, the more Johnny likes Sam and doesn't care to kill him. But when the doctor is found dead, Johnny becomes a suspect. He leaves town and takes Sam along, hiding him at a farm. Family members suddenly miss Sam being around and begin leading better lives. Sam finds a reason to go on living, and Johnny is also a changed man.

Cast  
Don "Red" Barry as Johnny April 
Henry Hull as Sam Winston
Dale Evans as Gloria Winston
Chick Chandler as Shoelace
Matt McHugh as The Worrier
Nana Bryant as Mrs. Winston
Walter Catlett as Ramsey Fensel
Edward Gargan as Donovan
Chester Clute as Gwylim
Peter Lawford as Jerry Winston
Georges Metaxa as Dr. Kenton 
Dorothy Burgess as Toodles

References

External links
 

1943 films
1940s English-language films
American crime drama films
1943 crime drama films
Republic Pictures films
Films directed by George Sherman
American black-and-white films
1940s American films